Glen Anthony Mitchell (born 19 October 1972) is a New Zealand cyclist.

Mitchell was born in 1972 in Putāruru in the Waikato. He competed at the 1996 Summer Olympics in Atlanta, in the men's individual road race, and at the 2000 Summer Olympics in Sydney, in the men's individual road race. He did not finish in either competition.

He was the Oceania road race champion in 1997. He won the 2000 Tour of Southland.

References

External links
 

1972 births
Living people
New Zealand male cyclists
Olympic cyclists of New Zealand
Cyclists at the 1996 Summer Olympics
Cyclists at the 2000 Summer Olympics
Cyclists at the 2006 Commonwealth Games
Commonwealth Games competitors for New Zealand
People from Putāruru
Sportspeople from Waikato
20th-century New Zealand people
21st-century New Zealand people